Claudette Joseph is a Grenadian politician from the National Democratic Congress. She has served as the attorney general and minister of legal affairs, labour and consumer affairs since 1 July 2022.

References 

Living people
Year of birth missing (living people)
Place of birth missing (living people)
21st-century Grenadian politicians
21st-century Grenadian women politicians
Attorneys General of Grenada
Female justice ministers
National Democratic Congress (Grenada) politicians
Women government ministers of Grenada